Daniel Baron Cohen (born 8 May 1957) is a British playwright, community-theatre director, cultural theorist and arts-educator, presently living and working in Brazil.

Biography
Following undergraduate and post-graduate research into popular educational theatre at the University of Oxford, Dan Baron Cohen was apprenticed to the playwrights Edward Bond (England) and Ngũgĩ wa Thiong'o (Kenya), whose life projects inspired a lasting search for methods of community-based cultural action for justice.

In 1998, Baron Cohen worked as a visiting professor at the State University of Santa Catarina in Brazil. His past 21 years of collaborations with landless, indigenous, trade-union, university, and indigenous communities in Brazil, Peru, Chile in China, Taiwan, Korea, Japan, and since 2008, with an Afro-Indigenous community in the south-eastern region of the Amazonian state of Pará, have advanced his methods into a pedagogy of intercultural literacy and a poetics of "transformance". This pedagogy also draws on collaborations with the World Social Forum and the Brazilian Network of Arteducators (ABRA), and contributed to the 7th IDEA World Congress of Drama/Theatre & Education in Belém, Pará, IDEA 2010.

At the 2007 International Drama in Education and the Arts (IDEA) World Congress, Baron Cohen was re-elected as the President of IDEA. As the President of IDEA until July 2010, he was also Coordinator of the World Alliance for Arts Education, and was a member of the International Committee for the World Social Forum.

Since 2008, following national awards from the Ministries of Culture and of Education, and from UNICEF and UNESCO in Brazil, Baron Cohen has been living and working in Cabelo Seco, founding afro-indigenous community of Marabá City, developing the paradigm project Rios de Encontro (Rivers of Meeting). and its Community University of the Rivers.

In 2016 he travelled to New Zealand to lecture in support of a festival drawing attention to the need for clean rivers. Baron Cohen has deepened collaborations with the Maori peoples, Auckland University and Melbourne University in Australia, in the development of Good Living projects and forums in the Amazon.

He is the cousin of comedian Sacha Baron Cohen and brother of psychologist Simon Baron Cohen.

Publications
Dan Baron Cohen has published Theatre of Self-Determination (Derry, 2001),, Alfabetização Cultural: a luta íntima por uma nova humanidade (Cultural Literacy: the intimate struggle for a new humanity), São Paulo 2004,, Colheita em Tempos de Seca: cultivando pedagogias de vida por comunidades sustentáveis (Harvest in Times of Drought: cultivating pedagogies of life for sustainable communities), Marabá 2011,, chapters for Routledge, Palgrave Macmillan and IDEA publications, and numerous articles, most recently for New Internationalist magazine.

Personal life
Dan is married to the Brazilian arts educator Manoela Souza. His siblings include the academic Simon Baron-Cohen and the filmmaker Ash Baron-Cohen. He is the cousin of actor and comedian Sacha Baron Cohen.

References

21st-century Brazilian dramatists and playwrights
21st-century Brazilian male writers
English people of Belarusian-Jewish descent
English people of German-Jewish descent
Brazilian male dramatists and playwrights
Living people
1957 births
 English expatriates in Brazil